The Sexsmith Vipers are a Junior "B" Ice Hockey team based in Sexsmith, Alberta, Canada. They are members of the North West Junior Hockey League (NWJHL). They play their home games at Sexsmith Arena.

Season-by-season record
Note: GP = Games played, W = Wins, L = Losses, OTL = Overtime Losses, Pts = Points, GF = Goals for, GA = Goals against, PIM = Penalties in minutes

External links
Official website of the Sexsmith Vipers

Ice hockey teams in Alberta